Van Reeth Glacier is a tributary glacier about 20 nautical miles (37 km) long, draining westward to Scott Glacier between Mounts Blackburn and Bowlin, in the Queen Maud Mountains. It was discovered in December 1934 by the Byrd Antarctic Expedition geological party under Quin Blackburn, and was named by the Advisory Committee on Antarctic Names (US-ACAN) for Commander Eugene W. Van Reeth, a pilot with U.S. Navy Squadron VX-6 in Antarctica during Operation Deep Freeze 1966, 1967 and 1968, and squadron commander in 1969. Later in his career, Commander Van Reeth was promoted to captain, and eventually became the commanding officer of Operation Deep Freeze Task Force 43 in the 1970s.

References

Glaciers of Marie Byrd Land